Lemyra boghaika is a moth of the family Erebidae. It was described by Yuri A. Tshistjakov and Yasunori Kishida in 1994. It is found in the Russian Far East (Khabarovsk and Primorye Provinces) and Korea. It is probably also present in China (where it is expected to occur in Heilongjiang, Jilin and Liaonin).

The length of the forewings is 15–17 mm for males and 20–22 mm for females. The wings are white. The forewings with two blackish streaks in the discal cell. The hindwings have three blackish spots.

Etymology
The species name is derived from the name of the ancient state of Boghai.

References

 

boghaika
Moths described in 1994